Ojo de Agua is a department of Argentina in Santiago del Estero Province.  The capital city of the department is Villa Ojo de Agua.

References

Departments of Santiago del Estero Province